The Laboratory for Analysis and Architecture of Systems (LAAS) is a research laboratory linked with the French National Centre for Scientific Research (CNRS). This facility is located near other important higher education facilities in Toulouse, France: the Paul Sabatier University, SUPAERO, the ENAC, the INSA, as well as other research centers (the ONERA and the CNES).

Activities 

The activities of the laboratory are mostly concentrated in the following topics:

 Methods and Algorithms in Control
 Telecommunication Networks and Systems	
 Qualitative Diagnosis and Supervisory Control	
 Software and Tools for Communicating Systems
 Dependable Computing and Fault Tolerance	
 Robotics and Artificial Intelligence	
 Microsystems and Systems Integration
 Micro and Nanostructures Technologies	
 Power Integration and Devices
 Photonics
 Microwave and Millimeter Wave Integrated Components for Telecommunication
 Nano-addressing, Nano-biotechnologies	
 Modelling, Optimization and  Integrated Management of Systems of Activities

See also 

Research institutes in France
Laboratories in France
Information technology research institutes
French National Centre for Scientific Research